The United States was the host nation of the 1984 Summer Olympics in Los Angeles, California. It was the nineteenth time that Team USA participated, having boycotted the 1980 Summer Olympics. 522 competitors, 339 men and 183 women, took part in 217 events in 25 sports.

These Olympic Games were unique for the United States in that the host state was California, the home state of the country's president, Ronald Reagan, who himself opened the Games, becoming the first American president to open a Summer Olympics, and also any Olympic games in the United States. Reagan was governor of the state from 1967 to 1975. It was not until the 2002 Winter Olympics in Salt Lake City that an American president opened a Winter Olympics in the United States.

The United States topped the medal count for the first time since 1968, winning a record 83 gold medals and surpassing the Soviet Union’s total of 80 golds at the 1980 Summer Olympics.

Medalists

The following U.S. competitors won medals at the games. In the by discipline sections below, medalists' names are bolded. 

|style="text-align:left; width:74%; vertical-align:top;"|

|  style="text-align:left; width:26%; vertical-align:top;"|

* - Indicates that the athlete competed in preliminaries but not the final.

Archery

The United States returned to archery competition with a dominant men's team that earned the top two spots. Their women were not as successful against the newly powerful Asian teams from Korea, China, and Japan, but still managed to place an archer in the top eight.

Athletics

Men
Road and track events

 - Indicates the athlete ran in a preliminary round but not the final.

Field events

Combined event – Decathlon

Women
Road and track events

 - Indicates the athlete ran in a preliminary round but not the final.

Field events

Combined event – Heptathlon

Basketball

Summary

Men's tournament

Roster

Head coach: Bob Knight

Preliminary round
Group B

Quarterfinal

Semifinal

Gold medal game

Women's tournament

Roster
Cathy Boswell
Denise Curry
Anne Donovan
Teresa Edwards
Lea Henry
Janice Lawrence
Pamela McGee
Carol Menken-Schaudt
Cheryl Miller
Kim Mulkey
Cindy Noble
Lynette Woodard

Preliminary round

Gold medal game

Boxing

Canoeing

Men

Women

Key: QF – Qualified to medal final; SF – Qualified to semifinal; R – Qualified to repechage

Cycling

Twenty cyclists represented the United States in 1984.

Road

Men

Women

Track

Points race

Pursuit

Sprint

Time trial

Diving

Men

Women

Equestrian

Dressage

Eventing

Jumping

Fencing

Twenty fencers represented the United States in 1984.

Men

Women

Field hockey

Summary

Men's tournament

Roster
 Mohammed Barakat
 Ken Barrett
 Rawle Cox
 Trevor Fernandez
 Scott Gregg
 Manzar Iqbal
 Michael Kraus
 Randy Lipscher
 David McMichael
 Gary Newton
 Michael Newton
 Brian Spencer
 Morgan Stebbins
 Robert Stiles
 Andrew Stone
 Nigel Traverso

Preliminary round
Group A

9th-12th place classification

11th place match

Women's tournament

Roster
 Gwen Cheeseman (gk)
 Beth Anders
 Kathleen McGahey
 Anita Miller
 Regina Buggy
 Christine Larson-Mason
 Beth Beglin
 Marcella Place
 Julie Staver
 Diane Moyer
 Sheryl Johnson
 Charlene Morett
 Karen Shelton
 Brenda Stauffer
 Leslie Milne
 Judy Strong

Round robin

Football

Summary

Roster
Head coach:  Alketas Panagoulias

Group stage – Group D

Gymnastics

Artistic

Men
Team

Individual finals

Women
Team

Individual finals

Rhythmic

Handball

Summary

Men's tournament

Roster
James Buehning
Bob Djokovich
Tim Dykstra
Craig Gilbert
Steven Goss
William Kessler
Stephen Kirk
Peter Lash
Michael Lenard
Joseph McVein
Gregory Morava
Rod Oshita
Thomas Schneeberger
Joe Story
Head coach: Javier Garcia

Preliminary Round
Group B
Lost to West Germany (19:21)
Lost to Denmark (16:19)
Lost to Sweden (18:21)
Lost to Spain (16:17)
Drew with South Korea (22:22)

9th place final
Defeated Japan (24:16)

Women's tournament
Roster
Pamela Boyd
Reita Clanton
Theresa Contos
Sandra de la Riva
Mary Dwight
Carmen Forest
Melinda Hale
Leora Jones
Carol Lindsey
Cynthia Stinger
Penelope Stone
Janice Trombly
Sherry Winn
Head coach: Klement Capilar

Judo

Modern pentathlon

Three male modern pentathletes represented the United States in 1984. They won the silver medal in the team event.

Rowing

United States rowing results and competitors:

Men

Women

 - Race not run, times from heats were used to rank boats.Qualification legend: FA = Final A (medal); FB = Final B (non-medal); SF = Semifinal; R = Repechage

Sailing

Shooting

Men

Women

Open

Swimming

Men
{|class=wikitable style=font-size:90%;text-align:center
|-
!rowspan=2|Athlete
!rowspan=2|Event
!colspan=2|Heat
!colspan=2|Final
|-style=font-size:95%
!Time
!Rank
!Time
!Rank
|-
|align=left|Rowdy Gaines
|align=left rowspan=2|100 m freestyle
|50.41
|3 FA
|49.80 
|
|-
|align=left|Mike Heath
|50.39
|2 FA
|50.41
|4
|-
|align=left|Jeff Float
|align=left rowspan=2|200 m freestyle
|1:50.95
|5 FA
|1:50.18
|4
|-
|align=left|Mike Heath
|1:49.87
|2 FA
|1:49.10
|
|-
|align=left|George DiCarlo
|align=left rowspan=2|400 m freestyle
|3:53.44
|3 FA
|3:51.23 
|
|-
|align=left|John Mykkanen
|3:53.43
|2 FA
|3:51.49
|
|-
|align=left|George DiCarlo
|align=left rowspan=2|1500 m freestyle
|15:22.88
|4 FA
|15:10.59
|
|-
|align=left|Mike O'Brien
|15:21.04
|1 FA
|15:05.20
|
|-
|align=left|Rick Carey
|align=left rowspan=2|100 m backstroke
|55.74
|1 FA
|55.79
|
|-
|align=left|''Dave Wilson|56.71
|2 FA|56.35
|
|-
|align=left|Rick Carey|align=left rowspan=2|200 m backstroke
|1:58.99 
|1 FA|2:00.23
|
|-
|align=left|Jesse Vassallo
|2:04.51
|9 FB|colspan=2|
|-
|align=left|Steve Lundquist|align=left rowspan=2|100 m breaststroke
|1:03.55
|5 FA|1:01.65 
|
|-
|align=left|John Moffet
|1:02.16 
|1 FA|1:03.29
|5
|-
|align=left|John Moffet
|align=left rowspan=2|200 m breaststroke
|colspan=2|
|colspan=2|Did not advance
|-
|align=left|Richard Schroeder
|2:19.23
|5 FA|2:18.03
|4
|-
|align=left|Matt Gribble
|align=left rowspan=2|100 m butterfly
|55.39
|11 FA|colspan=2|
|-
|align=left|Pablo Morales|53.78 
|1 FA|53.23
|
|-
|align=left|Patrick Kennedy
|align=left rowspan=2|200 m butterfly
|2:00.28
|8 FA|2:01.03
|8
|-
|align=left|Pablo Morales
|1:59.19 NR|4 FA|1:57.75
|4
|-
|align=left|Steve Lundquist
|align=left rowspan=2|200 m individual medley
|2:06.10
|6 FA|2:04.91
|5
|-
|align=left|Pablo Morales|2:04.32
|3 FA|2:03.05
|
|-
|align=left|Jeff Kostoff
|align=left rowspan=2|400 m individual medley
|4:22.55
|2 FA|4:23.28
|6
|-
|align=left|Jesse Vassallo
|4:23.82
|6 FA|4:21.46
|4
|-
|align=left|Matt BiondiChris CavanaughRowdy GainesMike HeathTom Jager*Robin Leamy*|align=left|4 × 100 m freestyle relay
|3:20.14
|2 FA|3:19.03 
|
|-
|align=left|Jeff FloatGeoff Gaberino*Bruce HaysMike HeathDavid LarsonRichard Saeger*|align=left|4 × 200 m freestyle relay
|7:18.87 
|1 FA|7:15.69 
|
|-
|align=left|Rick CareyRowdy GainesMike Heath*Tom Jager*Steve LundquistPablo MoralesRichard Schroeder*Dave Wilson*|align=left|4 × 100 m medley relay
|3:44.33
|2 FA|3:39.30 
|
|}

Women

* - Athlete swam in the heat but not the final.
Note: Times in the first round ranked across all heats.
Qualification legend: FA – Advance to medal final; FB – Advance to non-medal final

Synchronized swimming

Volleyball

Summary

Men's tournament

Roster
 Aldis Berzins
 Craig Buck
 Rich Duwelius
 Dusty Dvorak
 Karch Kiraly
 Chris Marlowe
 Pat Powers
 Steven Salmons
 Dave Saunders
 Paul Sunderland
 Steve Timmons
 Marc WaldiePreliminary round (group A) Defeated Argentina (3-1)
 Defeated Tunisia (3-0)
 Defeated South Korea (3-0)
 Lost to Brazil (0-3)Semi Finals Defeated Canada (3-0)Final Defeated Brazil (3-1)

Women's tournament

Roster
 Paula Weishoff
 Susan Woodstra
 Rita Crockett
 Laura Flachmeier
 Carolyn Becker
 Flo Hyman
 Rose Magers
 Julie Vollertsen
 Debbie Green-Vargas
 Kimberly Ruddins
 Jeanne Beauprey
 Linda ChisholmHead coach: Arie SelingerPreliminary round (group B) Defeated West Germany (3-0)
 Defeated Brazil (3-2)
 Defeated China (3-1)Semi Finals Defeated Peru (3-0)Final Lost to China (1-3)

Water polo

Summary

Roster
 Craig Wilson
 Kevin Robertson
 Gary Figueroa
 Peter Campbell
 Doug Burke
 Joseph Vargas
 Jon Svendsen
 John Siman
 Andrew McDonald
 Terry Schroeder
 Jody Campbell
 Timothy Shaw
 Christopher DorstPreliminary round (group B) Defeated Greece (12-5)
 Defeated Brazil (10-4)
 Defeated Spain (10-8)Final Round (Group D)'''
 Defeated Netherlands (8-7)
 Defeated Australia (12-7)
 Defeated West Germany (8-7)
 Drew with Yugoslavia (5-5)

Weightlifting

Wrestling

See also
United States at the 1983 Pan American Games
United States at the 1984 Summer Paralympics

References

Nations at the 1984 Summer Olympics
1984
Summer Olympics